Zpívající pudřenka is a 1959 Czechoslovak film. The film starred Josef Kemr.

References

External links
 

1959 films
Czechoslovak drama films
1950s Czech-language films
Czech drama films
1950s Czech films